Alexander Robinson (14 August 1924 – 18 June 2012) was an Australian cricketer. He played two first-class matches for Western Australia in 1952/53.

References

External links
 

1924 births
2012 deaths
Australian cricketers
Western Australia cricketers
People from Boulder, Western Australia
Cricketers from Western Australia
Sportsmen from Western Australia